The following lists events that happened during 2004 in Cape Verde.

Incumbents
President: Pedro Pires
Prime Minister: José Maria Neves

Events
July 3: Local elections took place in the municipalities

Arts and entertainment
Germano Almeida's book O mar na Lajinha published

Sports
Sport Sal Rei Club won the Cape Verdean Football Championship

Deaths
Ildo Lobo (b. 1953), singer

References

 
Years of the 21st century in Cape Verde
2000s in Cape Verde
Cape Verde
Cape Verde